Fabian Gerard Joseph (born December 5, 1965) is a Canadian retired ice hockey centre. He is most prominent for his role with the Canadian national ice hockey team in the late 1980s and early 1990s. He is a winner of two Winter Olympic Silver medals. He was Captain of Team Canada at the Lillehammer Olympic games in 1994. After playing hockey, Joseph continued his career, notably coaching the men's ice hockey team at Dalhousie University.

Ice hockey career
Joseph had moderate success in the amateur leagues by scoring 127 points for the Victoria Cougars of the WHL in 1984. Subsequently, Joseph was selected by the Toronto Maple Leafs 109th overall in the 1984 NHL Entry Draft. In 1985, he joined the Canadian national team. Joseph never actually played in the NHL. After his time on the national team, Joseph joined the Nova Scotia/Cape Breton Oilers (an affiliate with the Edmonton Oilers) in 1988. Joseph was captain of the team for the 1989 and 1990 AHL seasons. He also scored 30 goals or more in each of his three seasons with the team (31 in 1988, 32 in 1989 and 33 in 1990). Subsequently, in 1991-92, he returned to the Canadian National Team and won two Winter Olympic Silver medals (1992 and 1994) as well as being team captain. In all, Joseph had 163 points in 282 games while playing with the Canadian National team. Joseph also spent time playing in the Swiss and Italian Hockey leagues before ending his playing career with the Milwaukee Admirals of the International Hockey League in 1996.

Post playing career and coaching 
Joseph's coaching career began with the Milwaukee Admirals of the IHL (Now part of the AHL) between 1996 and 1998. He became assistant coach of the  Moncton Wildcats in the Quebec Major Junior Hockey League in the 2008-2009 season until 2011-12. He became head coach in the 2012-2013 season until 2014-2015. He then became the head coach of the Woodstock Slammers of the MJAHL in the 2015-2016 season

In 2002, Joseph was inducted into the Nova Scotia Sport Hall of Fame. He is also a member of the Cape Breton Sport Hall of Fame.

Career statistics

Regular season and playoffs

International

References

External links 

1965 births
Canadian ice hockey centres
Canadian people of Lebanese descent
Cape Breton Oilers players
Sportspeople from the Cape Breton Regional Municipality
Ice hockey players at the 1992 Winter Olympics
Ice hockey players at the 1994 Winter Olympics
Living people
Olympic ice hockey players of Canada
Olympic medalists in ice hockey
Olympic silver medalists for Canada
People from Sydney, Nova Scotia
Medalists at the 1994 Winter Olympics
Medalists at the 1992 Winter Olympics
Milwaukee Admirals (IHL) players
Nova Scotia Oilers players
Toronto Maple Leafs draft picks
Toronto Marlboros players
Victoria Cougars (WHL) players
Ice hockey people from Nova Scotia
Sportspeople of Lebanese descent
Nova Scotia Sport Hall of Fame inductees